Zdeněk Dohnal (born 11 August 1948) is a Czech former cyclist. He competed at the 1972 Summer Olympics and 1976 Summer Olympics.

References

External links
 

1948 births
Living people
Czech male cyclists
Olympic cyclists of Czechoslovakia
Cyclists at the 1972 Summer Olympics
Cyclists at the 1976 Summer Olympics
People from Znojmo
Sportspeople from the South Moravian Region